Pukarani (Aymara pukara fortress, -ni a suffix, "the one with a fortress", also spelled Pucarani) is a mountain in the Bolivian Andes which reaches a height of approximately . It is located in the La Paz Department, Loayza Province, Malla Municipality. Pukarani lies northwest of Chuqi Tira. The Malla Jawira flows along its south-western slopes.

References 

Mountains of La Paz Department (Bolivia)